Bristol Rovers Football Club are a professional football club in Bristol, England. They compete in League One, the third tier of the English football league system. The club's official nickname is "The Pirates", reflecting the maritime history of Bristol. The local nickname of the club is "The Gas", derived from the gasworks next to their former home, Eastville Stadium. The club play home matches at the Memorial Stadium in Horfield, they have been competing there since 1996. 

The club spent 89 years in the heart of North Bristol between 1897 to 1986 at the Eastville Stadium. Following a sale of the land they spent ten years at Twerton Park in Bath. The club’s nickname: “The Gas” originally began as a derogatory term used by fans of their main rivals, Bristol City, but was affectionately adopted by the club and its supporters. Cardiff City and Swindon Town are considered their second and third biggest rivals. Other rivalries include; Cheltenham Town, Exeter City, Forest Green Rovers, Plymouth Argyle, Torquay United and Yeovil Town. These rivalries are considered West Country Derbies and are often heated encounters. The women's team play in the Gloucestershire County Women's League.

The club was founded in 1883 as Black Arabs F.C. and entered the Bristol & District League as Eastville Rovers in 1892. The club moved to the Birmingham & District League in 1897, then changed divisions to the Southern League as Bristol Rovers in 1899. They won the Southern League in 1904–05 and were admitted to the Football League in 1920. They were placed in the Third Division South the following year and remained there until winning promotion as champions in 1952–53. They recorded their highest finishing positions in 1956 and 1959, a sixth-place finish in the Second Division, before suffering relegation in 1962. Promoted in second-place in 1973–74, they spent another seven seasons in the second tier until relegation in 1981. They won the Third Division title in 1989–90, though this time lasted just three seasons in the second tier and were relegated back into the fourth tier by 2001.

Rovers won the League Two play-off final in 2007, but relegations in 2011 and 2014 saw the club drop into the Conference Premier. They finished second in the Conference under the stewardship of Darrell Clarke and immediately regained their Football League status with victory in the 2015 play-off Final. They followed up this success by securing promotion out of League Two at the end of the 2015–16 season. They were relegated from the third tier in 2020–21 but returned at the first attempt. Rovers have won the Gloucestershire Cup 32 times, the Third Division South Cup in 1932, the Watney Cup in 1972, and have been Football League Trophy finalists two times.

History

Early years 

The club was formed following a meeting at the Eastville Restaurant in Bristol in September 1883. It was initially called Black Arabs F.C., after the Arabs rugby team and the predominantly black kits in which they played. This name only lasted for the 1883–84 season, and in a bid to draw more fans from the local area the club was renamed Eastville Rovers in 1884.

The club played only friendly games until the 1887–88 season, when it took part in the Gloucestershire Cup for the first time. In 1892 the club became a founder member of the Bristol and District League, which three years later was renamed the Western League. In 1897 Eastville Rovers joined the Birmingham and District League, and for two seasons played in both this league and the Western League. At the beginning of the 1897–98 season, the club turned professional and changed its name to Bristol Eastville Rovers, and on 17 February 1899 the name was officially changed to Bristol Rovers. In 1899 Bristol Rovers joined the newly formed Southern League, where they remained until 1920, winning the league title along the way in 1905.

Into the Football League 
For the 1920–21 season, the Southern League teams were moved into the new Division Three of the Football League, which became Division Three (South) the following season. They remained in this division for over 30 years, before winning the league, and promotion in the 1952–53 season.

The team has won promotion on six other occasions: in 1973–74 from the Third Division to the Second Division, again in 1989–90 as Division Three champions, in 2006–07 to the Football League One, in 2014–15 to League Two from the Conference Premier, in 2015–16 to League One and then in 2021-22 to League One from League Two. The club has been relegated six times—in 1961–62, 1980–81, 1992–93, 2000–01, 2010–11 and most recently at the end of the 2013–14 season.

The highest position in the football ladder achieved by Rovers at the end of season is sixth place in the second tier, which they did twice; once in 1955–56, and again in 1958–59. The closest they came to the top flight was in 1955–56, when they ended the season just four points below the promotion positions. The lowest league position achieved by the club is twenty-third out of twenty-four teams in the fourth tier, which has occurred twice. In the 2001–02 season, relegation from the Football League was narrowly avoided on two counts; firstly they ended just one league position above the relegation zone, and secondly the rules were changed the following season to increase the number of relegation places to two, meaning that if Rovers had finished in that position one year later they would have been relegated. This position was matched at the end of the 2013–14 season, which this time saw Rovers relegated to the Conference for the first time. They returned to the league at the end of their first Conference season, with a penalty shootout victory over Grimsby Town in the play-off final. In February 2016 it was announced that a 92% stake in the club had been bought by the Jordanian al-Qadi family and that Wael al-Qadi, a member of the Jordan Football Association, would become the president. The club is now owned by Dwane Sports Ltd with 92.6% of the shares with Bristol Rovers Supporters Club owning the remaining 7.4%. In May 2016 the club recorded a second consecutive promotion in dramatic fashion finishing third in League Two after a 92nd-minute goal secured victory over Dagenham and Redbridge and Accrington Stanley failed to beat Stevenage on the last day of the season. It marked the first time Rovers had reached the third tier of English Football since relegation in 2011. In June 2020 it was announced that president Wael al-Qadi had obtained a 90% stake in Dwane Sports Ltd after buying the shares of other members of his family it was also announced that the club's debt would be capitalised and a new training facility would begin construction at Hortham Lane, Almondsbury which is close to the M5 motorway. Rovers have owned the site known as 'The Colony' since 2017 and in June 2020 the club announced that it would be ready for the start of the 2020–21 season.

Cup competitions 

The only major cup competition won by Bristol Rovers is the 1972 Watney Cup, when they beat Sheffield United in the final. The club also won the Division Three (South) Cup in 1934–35, as well as winning or sharing the Gloucestershire Cup on 32 occasions. The team has never played in European competition; the closest Rovers came was when they missed out on reaching the international stage of the Anglo-Italian Cup in the 1992–93 season on a coin toss held over the phone with West Ham United.

In the FA Cup, Rovers have reached the quarter-final stage on three occasions. The first time was in 1950–51 when they faced Newcastle United at St James' Park in front of a crowd of 62,787, the record for the highest attendance at any Bristol Rovers match. The second time they reached the quarter final was in 1957–58, when they lost to Fulham, and the most recent appearance at this stage of the competition was during the 2007–08 season, when they faced West Bromwich Albion. They were the first Division Three team to win an FA Cup tie away to a Premier League side, when in 2002 they beat Derby County 3–1 at Pride Park Stadium.

They have twice reached the final of the Football League Trophy, in 1989–90 and 2006–07, but finished runners-up on both occasions. On the second occasion they did not allow a single goal against them in the competition en route to the final, but conceded the lead less than a minute after the final kicked off.

Rivalries 

Bristol Rovers main rivals are city neighbours Bristol City, with whom they contest the Bristol derby. This rivalry was deemed 8th fiercest rivalry in English football in an in-depth report by the Football Pools in 2008. The most recent encounter between the clubs took place on 4 September 2013, which saw Rovers beaten by City in a Football League Trophy tie at Ashton Gate Stadium by a 2–1 scoreline. Other rivals are Newport County and mainly teams from the West Country, such as Swindon Town, Cheltenham Town, Yeovil Town and Forest Green Rovers.

In the past, rivalries also emerged with Severnside rivals Cardiff City known as the Severnside derby. Rovers most recent meeting against Cardiff was a League Cup match on 11 August 2016, which Rovers won 1–0 with Chris Lines scoring the winner. The last time Cardiff and Bristol Rovers were in the same league was in the 1999–2000 season.

The first time Rovers encountered Yeovil was a Football League Trophy match which was played on 31 October 2001, which Rovers won via a penalty shoot-out. The most recent encounter between the teams was in a Football League Two match on 16 April 2016, which Rovers won 2–1. Because of the close proximity many players have also represented both the clubs, for example Adam Virgo, Gavin Williams, Dominic Blizzard and Tom Parkes.

Rovers last played Swindon Town in the 2021–22 League Two season (a 1–1 draw) Cheltenham Town in the 2022–23 League One season (Rovers won 2–1), and Cheltenham 1 Rovers 4 earlier in the season, completing a 22/23 double, and Forest Green Rovers in the 2022–23 League One season (a 2–1 home defeat).

Other clubs in the West country such as Plymouth Argyle and Exeter City have also been considered rivals despite being further away from Bristol (162 km for Plymouth and 104 km for Exeter). Bristol Rovers last played Plymouth in the 2022–23 League One season where Rovers drew 2–2 at home and they last played Exeter at home in the 2022–23 season when they lost 4–3.

Colours and badge 

Bristol Rovers are known for their distinctive blue and white quartered shirts, which they have worn for most of their history. The current home kit consists of a light blue and white quartered shirt and white shorts, while the away kit is black and gold with the same colours as the trim. During the 2008–09 season a special third strip, which is black with a gold sash, and is a reproduction of the original Black Arab shirt, was used for a single match to celebrate the 125th anniversary of the club.

The team began playing in black shirts with a yellow sash from their foundation in 1883 as Black Arabs F.C. until 1885, by which time they were called Eastville Rovers. For the next fourteen years, until 1899, the team wore blue and white hooped shirts. These were replaced by black and white striped shirts until 1919.

When Rovers were admitted to The Football League in 1920 they wore white shirts with blue shorts. These remained the team colours until 1930, when the colours were reversed to blue shirts and white shorts for one season. The blue and white quarters were first worn in 1931, when they were introduced to try to make the players look larger and more intimidating. Rovers continued to wear the quarters for 31 years until they were replaced by blue pinstripes on a white background.

Over the next ten years, Rovers went on to wear blue and white stripes, all blue, and blue shirts with white shorts before returning to the blue and white quarters in 1973, which have remained the colours ever since. During the 1996–97 season, Rovers wore an unpopular striped quartered design, prompting fans to refer to it as the Tesco bag shirts because of their similarity to the design used for the company's carrier bags. The change in design prompted the Trumpton Times fanzine to change its name to Wot, No Quarters?

The black and gold shirts were also used as the away kit for the 2002–03 season, the club's 120th anniversary.

In 2005, Rovers ran an April Fools' joke on their official website, stating that the team's new away strip would be all pink. Although this was intended to be a joke, a number of fans petitioned the club to get the kit made for real, and also suggested that funds raised through the sale of the pink shirts should be donated to a breast cancer charity. Although the pink shirts were never used in a competitive fixture, they were worn for a pre-season friendly against Plymouth Argyle in 2006.

A pirate features on both the club badge and the badge of the supporters club, reflecting the club nickname of The Pirates. Previous club badges have featured a blue and white quartered design, based on the quartered design of the team's jerseys.

Kit suppliers and sponsors 
Rovers first used Bukta as an official kit supplier in 1977, and Great Mills as the first kit sponsor followed 1981. Rovers' longest running kit supplier is Errea who supplied the club kits for eleven years (2005–16). The club's longest running kit sponsorship was from local company Cowlin Construction who sponsored the club for 11 years before ending the deal in 2009. Following the end of the Cowlin deal, sponsors were chosen by raffle, via the 1883 Club. This process lasted nine seasons before the club announced Football INDEX as new sponsors for both home and away kits. In 2019 Utilita become the main shirt sponsors of both the home and away kits for the 2019-2020 season, the deal was then extended in July 2020 to cover the 2020-2021 season marking the first time a shirt sponsor had lasted for more than one season since the end of the Cowlin sponsorship in 2009.

Stadium

Grounds 
Purdown – 1883–1884
Three Acres – 1884–1891
Schoolmasters Cricket Ground – 1891–1892
Durdham Down – 1892–1894
Ridgeway – 1894–1897
Eastville Stadium – 1897–1986
Twerton Park – 1986–1996
The Memorial Stadium – 1996–present

History 

Rovers play their home games at the Memorial Stadium in Horfield, a ground they formerly shared with Bristol Rugby. The team moved to The Mem, as it is known informally, at the beginning of the 1996–97 season, initially as tenants but purchased it two years later.

When Bristol Rovers were known as Black Arabs F.C. in 1883, they played their home games at Purdown, Stapleton. The following year they moved to Three Acres, the precise location of which is not known, but is believed to have been in the Ashley Down area of Bristol, where they remained for seven years. This was followed by brief stays at the Schoolmasters Cricket Ground, Durdham Down and Ridgeway.

For the majority of their history, Bristol Rovers have played their home games at the Eastville Stadium, where they remained for a period of 89 years from 1897 to 1986. Financial problems led to the team being forced to leave Eastville, and they found a temporary home at Twerton Park, the home of Bath City. They stayed in Bath for 10 seasons, before returning to Bristol in 1996.

Rovers also played five home games at Ashton Gate Stadium, home of rivals Bristol City, following a fire which destroyed the South Stand of the Eastville Stadium on the night of the 16–17 August 1980. Rovers returned to Eastville in October 1980. During World War II, some friendly matches were played in Kingswood, and in their early history some games were played at Parson Street, Bedminster

In January 2007 planning permission was granted for a new 18,500 capacity all-seater stadium to be built on the site of the Memorial Stadium. The project was abandoned after a series of delays. In June 2011, the club announced its intention to relocate the club to a new 21,700 all-seater stadium on the University of the West of England's Frenchay campus. The planned UWE Stadium was shelved in August 2017 due to disputes between the club and the university, and attention returned to redeveloping the Memorial Stadium.

In 2017 there was a crowd recording for the 2018 Aardman film Early Man at the Memorial Stadium.

In June 2020 the club began construction of a new training facility at a site on Hortham Lane, Almondsbury near the M5 motorway. The site is set to include two full size pitches, a goalkeeping area, a gym and a clubhouse building. Having owned the land since 2017, no work had previously been carried out before the club moved into the training ground for the start in October 2020.

Supporter culture 

The team traditionally draws the majority of its support from north and east Bristol and South Gloucestershire. Many towns and villages in the surrounding area are also home to significant pockets of Rovers supporters.

The nickname given to Bristol Rovers supporters is "Gasheads". "The Gas" was originally coined as a derogatory term by the supporters of Bristol Rovers' rivals Bristol City, and was in reference to the large gas works adjacent to the old Bristol Rovers stadium, in Eastville, Bristol which wafted the sometimes overpowering odour of town gas across the crowd. "Gasheads" was adopted as a name by a splinter group of Rovers supporters in the mid-1980s to early 1990s. The chant "Proud to be a Gashead" spread to regular fans, and a fanzine was produced called The Gashead.

The term "Gasheads" is now universally accepted within the English media and football fraternity as referring to Bristol Rovers supporters. After the club's relegation to Football League Two in 2001, the club designated the squad number 12 to the Gasheads to signify them as the club's 12th Man in recognition of their loyal support.

The retired Conservative MP for Hayes and Harlington Terry Dicks was a Bristol Rovers fan. He mentioned the club in parliament on 5 May 1994 when debating with Labour MP and Chelsea fan Tony Banks. Other notable fans are local musicians Roni Size and Geoff Barrow of Portishead and writer David Goldblatt. Former Bristol Rovers player and manager, Ian Holloway, who also managed QPR and Blackpool as well as featuring as a pundit, is still a big fan of the club.

Based on September 2014 statistics released by the Home Office, the Rovers fan base were named the Most Dangerous English Football fan base for the 2013-2014 season, with 57 arrests on the season, of which 35% were for "violent disorder." Particularly dangerous was the scene on 3 May 2014 when the Rovers were assured relegation from the Football League for the first time.

The Rovers fans have good relations with Spanish club CE Sabadell FC, which initially began due to several Rovers fans noticing that the club had the same colours. In July 2016 the clubs played each other in a pre-season match in Spain.

One Bristol Rovers print fanzine is currently active and is entitled Last Saturday Night. There is also a fan-run podcast and blog called GasCast.

Club song 
The song which is synonymous with Rovers is "Goodnight, Irene", which was written by Lead Belly.

Opinions differ as to how this came about but it is thought to have become popular in the 1950s when a version of the song was in the British charts—the line "sometimes I have a great notion to jump in the river and drown"—seemed to be particularly apt when Rovers lost as the Bristol Frome flows alongside the old Eastville ground. It is believed that John Clapham is responsible for the song as he used to work at Eastville stadium for the greyhound racing and the last record he would play at the end of the night was "Goodnight Irene" also having a daughter called Irene, the record would then be left in the player and was played at the football. Another theory is that it was sung at a fireworks display at the Stadium the night before a home game against Plymouth Argyle in the 1950s. During the game the following day, Rovers were winning quite comfortably and the few Argyle supporters present began to leave early prompting a chorus of "Goodnight Argyle" from the Rovers supporters—the tune stuck and "Irene" became the club song.

Another popular Bristol Rovers song is "Tote End Boys", which was written and sung by Ben Gunstone. The name derives from the section of Gasheads who stood in the Tote End terrace at Rovers' old home, Eastville Stadium.

Players

Current squad

Development squad and Under-18s

Out on loan

Notable former players

Hall of fame
The football club launched its official Hall of Fame in 2021 in partnership with Retro Rovers podcast with the purpose of recognising the players and managers who had had the greatest impact. It was announced that ten people would be inducted in the Hall at a rate of one per week in the first half of 2021, with three added per year thereafter. The first inductee was the club's all-time record goalscorer Geoff Bradford.

Other notable players
This is a list of the other most noted former players at Bristol Rovers Football Club (excluding those listed in the Hall of Fame above) stating the period that each player spent at the club, their nationality and their reason for being listed. To be included in this list a player must have made over 400 league appearances for the club, scored over 100 league goals or hold a club record.
Note: all details from Byrne & Jay (2003) unless otherwise stated

Club staff

Club personnel 
As of 21 September 2022

Board of directors

Managerial history 

36 men have been appointed as a manager of Bristol Rovers Football Club, excluding caretaker managers. Bobby Gould, Gerry Francis and John Ward are the only men to have been given the job on a permanent basis twice, although Garry Thompson had a spell as caretaker manager before later being appointed permanently, and Phil Bater was caretaker manager on two occasions.

 Alfred Homer 1899–1920
 Ben Hall 1920–21
 Andrew Wilson 1921–26
 Joe Palmer 1926–29
 David McLean 1929–30
 Albert Prince-Cox 1930–36
 Percy Smith 1936–37
 Brough Fletcher 1938–50
 Bert Tann 1950–68
 Fred Ford 1968–69
 Bill Dodgin Sr. 1969–72
 Don Megson 1972–77
 Bobby Campbell 1977–79
 Harold Jarman 1979–80
 Terry Cooper 1980–81
 Ron Gingell 1981 (caretaker)
 Bobby Gould 1981–83
 David Williams 1983–85
 Bobby Gould 1985–87
 Gerry Francis 1987–91
 Martin Dobson
 Dennis Rofe
 Malcolm Allison 1992–93
 Steve Cross 1993 (caretaker)
 John Ward 1993–96
 Ian Holloway 1996–2001 (player-manager 1996–99)
 Garry Thompson 2001 (caretaker)
 Gerry Francis 2001
 Garry Thompson 2001–02
 Phil Bater 2002 (caretaker)
 Ray Graydon 2002–04
 Phil Bater 2004 (caretaker)
 Russell Osman & Kevan Broadhurst 2004 (joint caretakers)
 Ian Atkins 2004–05
 Paul Trollope 2005–10
 Darren Patterson 2010–11 (caretaker)
 Dave Penney 2011
 Stuart Campbell 2011 (caretaker)
 Paul Buckle 2011–12
 Shaun North 2012 (caretaker)
 Mark McGhee 2012
 John Ward 2012–14
 Darrell Clarke 2014–18
 Graham Coughlan 2018–19 (caretaker)
 Graham Coughlan 2019
 Joe Dunne 2019 (caretaker)
 Kevin Maher 2019 (caretaker)
 Ben Garner 2019–20
 Tommy Widdrington 2020 (caretaker)
 Paul Tisdale 2020–21
 Tommy Widdrington 2021 (caretaker)
 Joey Barton 2021–

Youth Academy 
The Bristol Rovers Academy currently operates at The City Academy Bristol and Sir Bernard Lovell School. Current first-team squad members Luca Hoole and Jed Ward all graduated from the Academy to earn professional contracts. In May 2021, U16s player Kyrie Pierre joined Aston Villa for an undisclosed six-figure fee, a record fee received by the Academy for a player.  Perhaps the most successful former member of the academy is Scott Sinclair, who was signed by Chelsea in 2005 for £200,000, with further payments to the club possible, depending on performance. In October 2022, he returned to Bristol Rovers following his release from Championship club Preston North End. Other former Academy players currently contracted to teams in the Premier League or English Football League include Ryan Broom (Cheltenham Town), Ollie Clarke (Mansfield Town, Ellis Harrison (Port Vale), Alfie Kilgour (Mansfield Town), Tom Lockyer (Luton Town) and Matt Macey (Portsmouth).

Women's team 

The club had a successful women's team, formed in 1998 as Bristol Rovers W.F.C. following a merger with Cable-Tel L.F.C.. This merger came about as Bristol Rovers only had girls teams up to the under 16 age group level, so when girls reached the age of 16 they were forced to leave the club. The merger with Cable-Tel meant that Bristol Rovers had a senior squad. The club's name was changed to Bristol Academy W.F.C. in 2005 to reflect the increased investment from the Bristol Academy of Sport. In 2016, Bristol Academy were re-branded as Bristol City following a sponsorship arrangement with Rovers' local rivals.

In 2019 it was announced that Rovers were to reform their women's team. They have fielded two teams in the Gloucestershire County Women's Football League since the 2019–20 season. The relaunched Bristol Rovers Women's FC was founded by Matthew Davies and Nathan Hallett-Young. The first team currently play in Division One with a development team playing in Division Two.

Honours 
Bristol Rovers have won the following honours:

League
 Third Division/League One (Tier 3)
Champions (1): 1989–90
Runners-up (1): 1973–74
Promotion (1): 1969–70 
Third Division South (Tier 3)
Champions (1): 1952–53
 Southern League Division One (Tier 3)
Champions (1): 1904–05
 Fourth Division/League Two (Tier 4)
Promotion (2): 2015–16, 2021–22
Play-off winners (1): 2006–07
 National League (Tier 5)
Play-off winners (1): 2014–15

Cups
 Football League Third Division South Cup 
Winners (1): 1934–35
 Football League Trophy
Runners-up (2): 1989–90, 2006–07
 Watney Cup
Winners (1): 1972
 Gloucestershire Cup
Winners (32): 1888–89, 1902–03, 1904–05, 1913–14, 1924–25, 1927–28, 1934–35, 1935–36, 1937–38, 1947–48, 1948–49, 1950–51, 1953–54, 1954–55, 1955–56, 1958–59, 1962–63, 1963–64, 1964–65, 1965–66, 1967–68, 1973–74, 1974–75, 1981–82, 1982–83, 1983–84, 1984–85, 1988–89, 1989–90, 1992–93, 1993–94, 1994–95

Records

Scorelines 

 Biggest League Win:
 7–0 (v Brighton & Hove Albion, Division Three (South), 29 November 1952)
 7–0 (v Swansea City, Division Two, 2 October 1954)
 7–0 (v Shrewsbury Town, Division Three, 21 March 1964)
 7–0 (v Alfreton Town, Conference Premier, 25 April 2015)
 7–0 (v Scunthorpe United, League Two, 7 May 2022)
 Biggest Cup Win:
 Competition proper: 
 6–0 (v Merthyr Tydfil, FA Cup Round 1, 14 November 1987) 
 6–0 (v Darlington, FA Cup Round 2, 29 November 2020)
 Qualifying: 15–1 (v Weymouth, FA Cup Third Qualifying Round, 17 November 1900)
 Biggest League Defeat: 0–12 (v Luton Town, Division Three South, 13 April 1936)

Players 
 Most League Appearances: 546 – Stuart Taylor, 1966–1980
 Most Goals for club: 242 – Geoff Bradford, 1949–1964
 Most Goals in a season: 33 – Geoff Bradford, 1952–53
 Highest Transfer Fee Paid: £375,000 – Andy Tillson from Queens Park Rangers, November 1992
 Highest Transfer Fee Received: £2,600,000 – Barry Hayles to Fulham, November 1998

Other 
 Record Home Attendance: 38,472 (v Preston North End, FA Cup, 30 January 1960

Notes

References

Sources

External links 

 Supporters club website 
 Vital Gas
 The odd link between Bristol Rovers and the singer Leadbelly

 
Football clubs in England
Southern Football League clubs
English Football League clubs
National League (English football) clubs
Football clubs in Bristol
Association football clubs established in 1883
1883 establishments in England